Wabasca Airport  is located  southeast of Wabasca, Alberta, Canada.

References

External links
Place to Fly on COPA's Places to Fly airport directory

Registered aerodromes in Alberta
Municipal District of Opportunity No. 17